Diebler is a surname. Notable people with the surname include:

Jake Diebler (born 1986), American basketball coach and former player
Jon Diebler (born 1988), American former professional basketball player

See also
Deibler